The Samsung Galaxy A7 (2018) is a higher midrange Android smartphone produced by Samsung Electronics as part of the Samsung Galaxy A series. It was announced on 20 September 2018 as the successor of Samsung Galaxy A7 (2017).

The A7 (2018) is the first triple camera smartphone produced by Samsung, featuring 3 different cameras on the rear. It features a 6-inch Super AMOLED Infinity Display with curved edges similar to the Samsung Galaxy A8 (2018), a side-mounted fingerprint sensor on the power button and Dolby Atmos immersive sound technology.

Specifications

Design 
Galaxy A7 (2018) features a Gorilla Glass front panel with a reflective glass back panel, the side frame is made of plastic. It is available in black, blue, gold and pink with some models supporting dual-sim.

Hardware 
The A7 (2018) features a 6-inch Full HD+ (1080x2220 pixels) Super AMOLED display with 18.5:9 aspect ratio. The display features curved edges similar to the S9's infinity display, but with larger bezels and without curved sides.

The smartphone features an upgraded Exynos 7885 SoC with an octa-core processor consisting of 2 performance ARM Cortex-A73 and 6 efficient ARM Cortex-A53 cores and Mali-G71 MP2 GPU backed by 4 GB RAM and 64 GB/128 GB of internal storage that is expandable up to 512 GB via a dedicated microSD card slot. The device retains a non-removable battery like its predecessor, but at a lower rating of 3300mAh, and eliminates Fast-Charging capability. It features a typical microUSB connector, rather than its predecessor's newer USB-C connector. Unlike its predecessor, it does away with IP68 water and dust resistance.

The triple camera setup features a primary 24 MP sensor with f/1.7 aperture for normal photography, an ultra-wide 8 MP sensor with f/2.4 aperture and 120 degrees viewing angle, and a 5 MP depth sensor for effects such as Bokeh. The rear cameras feature an intelligent Scene Optimizer that include 19 different lighting modes for different scenes. The front camera is a 24MP sensor, complete with its own dedicated flash. The A7 (2018) rear camera features a Sony IMX576 camera sensor, identical to the A9(2018). The fingerprint sensor has been shifted from the back and integrated into the side-mounted power button, a first for a Samsung smartphone.

Software 
It runs Android 8.0 "Oreo" with Samsung Experience 9.0 out of the box. Its extra features include Bixby Home without Bixby voice support and Bixby button and always on display. It can be upgraded to Android 9 with One UI and Android 10 with One UI 2.

Availability
Following the unveiling, Samsung announced that the device will go on sale in selected European and Asian market from October 2018, with future plans to release in other countries.

References

Android (operating system) devices
Samsung Galaxy
Samsung smartphones
Mobile phones introduced in 2018
Mobile phones with multiple rear cameras
Discontinued smartphones